John Kunkel Small (January 31, 1869 – January 20, 1938) was an American botanist.

Born on January 31, 1869, in Harrisburg Pennsylvania, Kunkel studied botany at Franklin & Marshall College and Columbia University.  He was the first Curator of Museums at The New York Botanical Garden, a post in which he served from 1898 until 1906. From 1906 to 1934 he was Head Curator and then from 1934 until his death he was Chief Research Associate and Curator. Small's doctoral dissertation, published as Flora of the Southeastern United States in 1903, and revised in 1913 and 1933, remains the best floristic reference for much of the South. Assisted by the patronage of Charles Deering, Small traveled extensively around Florida recording plants and land formations.

Small was an early botanist explorer of Florida, documenting many things for the first time, although the flora and fauna were well known to the local Seminole Indians. His first trip to the region was in 1901. Over the next 37 years, Small visited many times "to collect specimens, to study the natural history of the region, and to photograph natural landscapes, tropical plants, Seminoles and other local folk". Small explored by both car and boat, often bringing along his wife Elizabeth, and their two boys and two girls.

"Small's botanical research was recorded in 450 published works, mostly articles, and numerous unpublished typescripts. Among his most well-known publications is the book From Eden to Sahara: Florida's Tragedy, which received acclaim in 1929 for documenting the severe deterioration of south Florida's botanical resources that he had observed up to that time."

References
Notes

Bibliography

External links
 John K. Small Collection: 2,135 images of South Florida 1901-1938

Bibliography

 Core, Earl L. (1938), "John Kunkel Small", Castanea, 3:27-28.
 Austin, Daniel F. et al. The Florida of John Kunkel Small. Bronx, NY: The New York Botanical Garden, 1987. .

American taxonomists
 01
1869 births
1938 deaths
Bryologists
Pteridologists
Botanists active in North America
Botanists with author abbreviations
Writers from Florida
19th-century American botanists
20th-century American botanists